Salal Bugti was born in Quetta, Balochistan on December 23, 1969. He was Nawab Bugti's second last child and last son from his first wife.

He was assassinated in June 1992 on Jinnah Road, Quetta by members of the Kalpar tribe, a sub-tribe of the Bugti tribe. According to Kalpar tribe, Salal Bugti was killed in retaliation of killing Amir Hamza. Amir Hamza was the son of Kalpar leader Khan Mohammad Kalpar. Kalpar tribe allege that Akbar Bugti was behind the assassination of Amir Hamza. Following the death of Amir Hamza, around 100,000 Kalpars left Dera Bugti and settled in Punjab and Sindh. Nawab Akbar Bugti justified the killing of Hamza by saying that Hamza was trying to forge an alliance between Kalpar and Masuri tribes. However, Akbar Bugti denied killing Amir Hamza. Both Masuri and Kalpar are sub-tribe of Bugti tribe and they were engaged in armed conflict with Akbar Bugti. Masuri and Kalpar tribe allege that Akbar Bugti had committed atrocities against their tribe.

References

1969 births
1992 deaths
Baloch people
People from Quetta